St. Peter is a constituency of the House of Representatives of Antigua and Barbuda that takes up portions of the Parish of Saint Peter, Parish of Saint George, and the Parish of Saint John.

It has 3,041 registered voters as of 2018.

The constituencies counting center is Parham Primary School in Parham Village.

Voting History

Villages 
The constituency comprises the villages of Parham, Pares, Sugar Factory, Gunthorpes, Weirs, North Sound, and Donavans.

Demographics 
St. Peter has 13 enumeration districts. 

 50700 Parham Lovers Lane
 50800 Parham Market
 50900 Parham Byham Wharf
 51001 Parham School_1
 51002 Parham School_2
 51003 Parham School_3
 51101 Pares East_1
 51102 Pares East_2
 51200 Pares West
 41602 Sugar Factory_2 Paynters Paradise
 41603 Sugar Factory_3
 41604 Sugar Factory_4
 41605 Sugar Factory_5

References 

Constituencies of Antigua and Barbuda